Gameloft SE is a French video game publisher based in Paris, founded in December 1999 by Ubisoft co-founder Michel Guillemot. The company operates 18 development studios worldwide, and publishes games with a special focus on the mobile games market. Formerly a public company traded at the Paris Bourse, Gameloft was acquired by media conglomerate Vivendi in 2016.

History

Game development strategy 
Gameloft was founded by Michel Guillemot, one of the five founders of Ubisoft, on 14 December 1999. By February 2009, Gameloft had shipped over 200 million copies of its games since its IPO, as well as 2 million daily downloads of its games via the App Store for iOS. Gameloft's chief financial officer (CFO), Alexandre de Rochefort, noted that the company's games generated about 400 times more revenue on iOS than on Android, partially because Google did not develop its Google Play storefront to "entice customers to actually buy products"; as a result of which Gameloft heavily cut its investments in Android games development in November 2009. In July 2010, Gameloft instead attempted to sell Android games directly through its website, avoiding the use of Google Play.

In a May 2011 keynote, de Rochefort stated that he wanted to avoid moving the company to the NASDAQ stock exchange, as the U.S. games market appeared to be nothing more than a large economic bubble, especially when seeing Zynga's then  total stock value.

Gameloft's games have often been accused of being clones of other properties; when asked about it at the November 2011 Consumer Electronics Show, chief executive officer (CEO) Michel Guillemot stated "The videogame industry has always played around a limited number of themes. There is maybe one new idea a year." In response to many users commenting on Guillemot's remarks, Levi Buchanan of IGN defended Gameloft, stating that its games were usually well-polished, in contrary to the original concepts' games.

By July 2014, Gameloft announced that they would focus more strongly on quality than on quantity, as was stated to have previously been the case.

In April 2013, Texan company Lodsys filed a lawsuit against Gameloft, among other mobile game developers, for infringing its patent on in-app purchases. Similar lawsuits were previously intervened by Apple Inc., who claim to have licensed the technology from Lodsys for usage in its App Store.

In February 2012 and February 2016, Gameloft penned publishing contracts with GREE, Inc. and GungHo Online Entertainment, respectively, to facilitate its presence in the Asian market.

Vivendi subsidiary 
In October 2015, French media conglomerate Vivendi announced that they had acquired a 6.2% stake in Gameloft's stock, which was quickly raised to 10.2% a few days later. By February 2016, Vivendi had acquired 30% in the company, and launched a hostile takeover bid. In accordance with French law, Vivendi started a tender offer to acquire further shares.

Following the announcement, Gameloft's board of directors strongly advised shareholders against selling stock to Vivendi to avoid the hostile takeover. By May 2016, Vivendi had won over the majority of shareholders, enabling them to move forward in the takeover.

The acquisition was completed on 1 June 2016, with Vivendi having acquired 56%, an absolute majority over Gameloft's ownership. Employees of Gameloft were presented with an open letter welcoming them to the new parent company's family.

Analysts believed that the takeover was just the first step towards also purchasing Ubisoft, another video game venture founded by Guillemot and his brothers, although Vivendi only held a 17.7% minority in that company at the time. In response to Vivendi's actions, Guillemot announced that he would step down from his company and join his brother Yves Guillemot at Ubisoft to prevent it from also being taken over. Guillemot later clarified that his stepping-down would take effect on 29 June.

On 8 June, the Guillemot brothers announced that they were regretfully selling their ownership in Gameloft to Vivendi. The transaction awarded Vivendi another 21.7% in Gameloft's capital. After Guillemot departed from Gameloft on 29 June, Vivendi set up a new board of directors for the company, with Vivendi's present chief operating officer (COO), Stéphane Roussel, appointed Gameloft's chairman and CEO, and Gameloft's previous CFO, de Rochefort, additionally taking over the management of the company's 39 subsidiaries. At that point, Vivendi owned 95.94% of Gameloft's share capital.

Corporate affairs 
Gameloft is headquartered at 14 rue Auber, 9th arrondissement of Paris.

Studios 
Gameloft operates 17 video game development studios worldwide. In July 2011, Glenn Watson, lead programmer of Gameloft's Auckland offshoot, stated that the company's management created a "constant sense of urgency" at its studio, having employees regularly work 12- to 14-hour days. A new studio in New Orleans was opened in August 2011, taking advantage of tax breaks granted by the government of Louisiana in July 2009 to establish 150 new jobs. On 29 January 2013, Gameloft's India studio in Hyderabad was closed midway through the workday, leaving 250 people unemployed. Between June and August 2015, Gameloft's Tokyo location made roughly 80 people, effectively being closed. Additionally, on 8 July 2015, all operations at the company's New York City office were halted, and as many as 100 employees were laid off. Shortly after, in September 2015, Gameloft's Seattle studio was closed down and its 15 employees were let go. The studio was opened just a year prior to its closure. Seven studios were closed in total in 2015. In January 2016, Gameloft opened a Nigerian marketing office for regional expansions, and shut down its Auckland studio, firing roughly 160 employees. At the time, Gameloft Auckland was New Zealand's largest video game studio. Gameloft's Valencia, Spain, location was shuttered in April 2016. In July 2017, Gameloft appointed John-Paul Burke as country manager for its subsidiaries in the United Kingdom and Ireland. Gameloft UK later closed in December 2019.

Services 
In October 2019, Gameloft announced a partnership with mobile operator Telecom Italia to open TIM I Love Games, a games subscription service for Android and iOS, exclusive to Italy and TIM Italy customers.

Games

References

External links 
 

2000 initial public offerings
2016 mergers and acquisitions
Companies based in Paris
Companies formerly listed on the Paris Bourse
French companies established in 1999
Mobile game companies
Video game companies established in 1999
Video game companies of France
Video game development companies
Video game publishers
Vivendi subsidiaries